Tiromancino is an Italian pop group founded in 1989 by Federico Zampaglione. They have released 13 albums.

Their music is a blend of folk and electronica.

Discography 
1992 - Tiromancyno
1994 - Insisto
1995 - Alone Alieno
1997 - Rosa spinto
2000 - La descrizione di un attimo
2002 - In continuo movimento
2004 - Illusioni parallele
2005 - 95-05 (greatest hits)
2007 - L'alba di domani
2008 - Il suono dei chilometri (live)
2010 - L`Essenziale"" (recorded in Los Angeles and co-produced by Saverio Principini)
2014 - Indagine su un sentimento2016 - Nel respiro del mondo''

References

External links 
 Official site

Italian musical groups
Musical groups established in 1989